Parliamentary elections were held in Andorra on 16 February 1997. The result was a victory for the Liberal Union, which won 16 of the 28 seats. Its leader, Marc Forné Molné, remained Prime Minister. Voter turnout was 81.6%.

Results

References

Andorra
1997 in Andorra
Parliamentary elections in Andorra
February 1997 events in Europe